Wrestling Dontaku 2017 was a professional wrestling event promoted by New Japan Pro-Wrestling (NJPW). The event took place on May 3, 2017, in Fukuoka, Fukuoka at Fukuoka Kokusai Center and featured ten matches, three of which were contested for championships. The show was headlined by Kazuchika Okada defending the IWGP Heavyweight Championship against Bad Luck Fale. This was the fourteenth event under the Wrestling Dontaku name.

Production

Storylines
Wrestling Dontaku 2017 featured ten professional wrestling matches that involved different wrestlers from pre-existing scripted feuds and storylines. Wrestlers portrayed villains, heroes, or less distinguishable characters in the scripted events that built tension and culminated in a wrestling match or series of matches.

Wrestling Dontaku 2017 was headlined by Kazuchika Okada making his fifth defense of the IWGP Heavyweight Championship against Bad Luck Fale. This match was set up on April 9 at Sakura Genesis 2017, where Fale attacked Okada after he had made his fourth successful title defense against the 2017 New Japan Cup winner Katsuyori Shibata. Fale, who had lost to Shibata in the final of the New Japan Cup, had defeated Okada on August 8, 2016, during the 2016 G1 Climax, but instead of a title shot, was granted a non-title match against Okada on September 22 at Destruction in Hiroshima, where he was defeated by the reigning IWGP Heavyweight Champion. The match at Wrestling Dontaku 2017 marked Fale's first shot at the IWGP Heavyweight Championship.

In the semi-main event, Kenny Omega took on Tomohiro Ishii. Prior to challenging Kazuchika Okada for the IWGP Heavyweight Championship at Wrestle Kingdom 11 in Tokyo Dome on January 4, 2017, Omega stated that he wanted to defend the title against Ishii. After failing to capture the title, Omega and Ishii faced off in the first round of the 2017 New Japan Cup, where Ishii was victorious, derailing Omega's quest for another shot at the IWGP Heavyweight Championship. On April 9, Omega pinned Ishii in a tag team match and afterwards requested a singles rematch with him, which was made official the following day.

Two more title matches were scheduled to take place at Wrestling Dontaku 2017. In the NEVER Openweight 6-Man Tag Team Championship match, Taguchi Japan (Hiroshi Tanahashi, Ricochet and Ryusuke Taguchi) would defend against previous champions Los Ingobernables de Japón (Bushi, Evil and Sanada) in a rematch from April 4. Meanwhile, the IWGP Tag Team Championship would be defended in a three-way match with new champions War Machine (Hanson and Raymond Rowe) facing Guerrillas of Destiny (Tama Tonga and Tanga Loa) and Tencozy (Hiroyoshi Tenzan and Satoshi Kojima). After defeating Tencozy for the title on April 9, War Machine accepted a rematch challenge from the previous champions as well as another challenge made backstage by Guerrillas of Destiny, leading to NJPW announcing the three-way match the following day.

Other matches at the event included the returning Cody taking on David Finlay and the Chaos and Suzuki-gun stables facing off in a ten-man tag team match.

Results

References

External links
Wrestling Dontaku 2017 at NJPW.co.jp

2017
2017 in professional wrestling
May 2017 events in Japan